The 2013 Marburg Open is a professional tennis tournament played on clay courts. It was the fourth edition of the tournament which is part of the 2013 ATP Challenger Tour. It take place in Marburg, Germany between 24 and 30 June 2013.

Singles main draw entrants

Seeds

 1 Rankings are as of June 17, 2013.

Other entrants
The following players received wildcards into the singles main draw:
  Andreas Beck
  Julian Lenz
  Maximilian Marterer
  Dominik Schulz

The following players received entry from the qualifying draw:
  Yannick Hanfmann
  Kristijan Mesaroš
  Stefan Seifert
  Alexey Vatutin

The following player received entry as special exempt:
  Norbert Gombos

Doubles main draw entrants

Seeds

1 Rankings as of June 17, 2013.

Other entrants
The following pairs received wildcards into the doubles main draw:
  Jannis Kahlke /  Tadej Turk
  Jan Beusch /  Lazar Magdinčev
  Nils Langer /  Marko Zelch

The following pair received entry using a protected ranking:
  Artem Sitak /  Rogier Wassen

Champions

Singles

  Andrey Golubev def.  Diego Sebastián Schwartzman 6–1, 6–3

Doubles

 Andrey Golubev /  Evgeny Korolev def.  Jesse Huta Galung /  Jordan Kerr, 6–3, 1–6, [10–6]

External links
Official Website 

2013 ATP Challenger Tour
Marburg Open
2013 in German tennis